Athanasius IV Salhoyo was the Patriarch of Antioch and head of the Syriac Orthodox Church from 986/987 until his death in 1002/1003.

Biography
Lazarus studied and became a monk at the monastery of Saint Aaron, in the vicinity of Callisura, a town near Melitene. Lazarus' sobriquet "Salhoyo" is interpreted by Aphrem Barsoum to reflect his origins in the town of Ṣalāḥiyya, east of Yarpuz, as opposed to the village of Ṣalaḥ in Tur Abdin. He was chosen to succeed John VII Sarigta as patriarch of Antioch and was consecrated on 21 October 986/987 (AG 1298) by Lazarus, archbishop of Anazarbus, at the village of Qattina in the province of Homs, upon which he assumed the name Athanasius.

The monastery of Barid, the residence of Athanasius' predecessor John and located near Melitene, was renovated by Athanasius and became the latter's residence also. According to the histories of Michael the Syrian and Bar Hebraeus, Athanasius was praised for his piety by Agapius II, the Chalcedonian (later termed Greek Orthodox) Patriarch of Antioch, in spite of their religious differences, who subsequently put an end to the persecution of non-Chalcedonians. The monk Gabriel is attested as syncellus (secretary) to Athanasius from 994 to 999. He served as patriarch of Antioch until his death in 1002/1003 (AG 1314) at the monastery of Saint Barsoum, where he was buried on the north side of the sanctuary. As patriarch, Athanasius ordained thirty-nine bishops, as per Michael the Syrian's Chronicle, whereas Bar Hebraeus in his Ecclesiastical History credits Athanasius with the ordination of thirty-eight bishops.

Works
In 1000, Athanasius compiled lectionaries from both the Old and New Testaments that were then recorded by his pupil the monk Romanus (Brit. Mus. MS. 258).

Episcopal succession
As patriarch, Athanasius ordained the following bishops:

Paul, archbishop of Tarsus
Andreas, archbishop of Cyrrhus
John, bishop of Arsamosata
Isaac, bishop of Callisura
Peter, bishop of Sarug
Iwannis, bishop of Mardin, Reshʿayna, and Kfar Tutho
Philoxenus, archbishop of Dara
Christodulus, bishop of Baalbek
Cyril, bishop of Armenia
Moses, bishop of Samosata
Basil, archbishop of Balesh
Timothy, archbishop of Mabbogh
Iwannis, archbishop of Herat
Gregory, bishop of Birtha
Moses, archbishop of Raqqa
Philoxenus, bishop of Tella Qastra
Ignatius, archbishop of Tikrit
Basil, bishop of 'Arqa
John, bishop of Zeugma
Ignatius, archbishop of Edessa
Dioscorus, archbishop of Emesa
Joseph, bishop of Tur Abdin
Thomas, archbishop of Anazarbus
Dionysius, bishop of Claudia
Timothy, bishop of Aphrah
John, bishop of Tur Abdin
Gabriel, bishop of Aleppo
Theodosius, archbishop of Maipherqat
Iwannis, bishop of Arsamosata
Philoxenus, archbishop of Mabbogh and Gisra
Jacob, bishop of Baalbek
Daniel, bishop of Armenia
Thomas, archbishop of Tiberias
Peter, bishop of Arabissus
Abraham, bishop of Zeugma
John, bishop of Doliche
Elias, bishop of Simandu
Ignatius, bishop of Arzen
Iwannis, archbishop of Melitene

References
Notes

Citations

Bibliography

1000s deaths
Syriac Patriarchs of Antioch from 512 to 1783
Year of birth unknown
10th-century births
10th-century Oriental Orthodox archbishops
11th-century Oriental Orthodox archbishops
10th-century Byzantine bishops
11th-century Byzantine bishops
11th-century Byzantine writers